The 2012 Blu-express.com Tennis Cup was a professional tennis tournament played on clay courts. It was the sixth edition of the tournament which was part of the 2012 ATP Challenger Tour. It took place in Todi, Italy between 10 and 16 September 2012.

Singles main draw entrants

Seeds

 1 Rankings are as of August 27, 2012.

Other entrants
The following players received wildcards into the singles main draw:
  Alessio di Mauro
  Daniele Giorgini
  Claudio Grassi
  Walter Trusendi

The following players received entry from the qualifying draw:
  Alberto Brizzi
  Enrico Burzi
  Arthur De Greef
  Germain Gigounon

Champions

Singles

 Andrey Kuznetsov def.  Paolo Lorenzi, 6–3, 2–0 ret.

Doubles

 Martin Fischer /  Philipp Oswald def.  Marco Cecchinato /  Alessio di Mauro, 6–3, 6–2

External links
Official Website

Blu-express.com Tennis Cup
Internazionali di Tennis Città dell'Aquila
2012 in Italian tennis